Kim Yong-su is a North Korean politician. He is a member of the Central Committee of the Workers' Party of Korea.

Biography
He is a member of the Central Committee of the Workers' Party of Korea and serves as the director of the Finance and Accounting Department of the Workers' Party of Korea. In 2007 he was Chairman of the Chagang Province People's Committee. In May 2016, in accordance with the decisions of the 7th Congress of the Workers' Party of Korea, he was elected to the 7th Central Committee of the Workers' Party of Korea. He was a member of the funeral committee of Ri Ul-sol.

References

Living people
Year of birth missing (living people)
Place of birth missing (living people)
Members of the 2nd Central Committee of the Workers' Party of Korea
Members of the 3rd Central Committee of the Workers' Party of Korea
Members of the 4th Central Committee of the Workers' Party of Korea
Members of the 6th Central Committee of the Workers' Party of Korea
Members of the 7th Central Committee of the Workers' Party of Korea
Members of the 8th Central Committee of the Workers' Party of Korea